Campaspe is a rural locality in the Charters Towers Region, Queensland, Australia. In the  Campaspe had a population of 123 people.
 
Balfes Creek is a very small town within the locality.

History
The former railway station of Balfes Creek, on the Great Northern railway line, which was opened in 1884, was in the locality. A  crossing loop is located in the immediate vicinity.

In 1942 work started on the construction of an airfield at Balfes Creek for defence purposes. An earth strip running parallel to the road and railway was cleared and levelled, but defence priorities changed and it was never sealed.

In the  Campaspe had a population of 123 people.

Geography
The Cape River flows south-east through a portion of the west of the locality before exiting, then returning to form part of the southern boundary. The Campaspe River flows south-east through the locality before joining the Cape on the southern boundary.

Road infrastructure
The Flinders Highway runs through the north of the locality, and the Gregory Highway runs through from north-east to south-east.

References 

Charters Towers Region
Localities in Queensland